Unified Canadian Aboriginal Syllabics Extended is a Unicode block containing extensions to the Canadian syllabics contained in the Unified Canadian Aboriginal Syllabics Unicode block for some dialects of Cree, Ojibwe, Dene, and Carrier.

History
The following Unicode-related documents record the purpose and process of defining specific characters in the Unified Canadian Aboriginal Syllabics Extended block:

References

Unicode blocks
Canadian Aboriginal syllabics